Li Jiangzhou (born January 1968 in Anhui, China) is a deputy director of the Office for Safeguarding National Security in Hong Kong. He is a former public security officer and has worked in the liaison office since 2016.

Sanctions 
On 9 November 2020, the United States sanctioned Li under Executive Order 13936 for his role in implementing the National Security Law.

References 

Living people
Year of birth missing (living people)